Darby's Rangers (released in the UK as The Young Invaders) is a 1958 war film directed by William Wellman and starring James Garner as William Orlando Darby, who organizes and leads the first units of United States Army Rangers during World War II. The movie was shot by Warner Brothers Studios in black and white, to match wartime stock footage included in the production. The film was inspired by the 1945 book Darby's Rangers: An Illustrated Portrayal of the Original Rangers, by Major James J. Altieri, himself a veteran of Darby's force. The supporting cast features Jack Warden and Stuart Whitman.

Plot
The US Army has decided to form an elite strike force similar to the British Commandos, led by Major William Darby (James Garner), a former staff officer. Darby is in command of the 1st Ranger Battalion, formed entirely from able-bodied volunteers. On June 19, 1942 the 1st Ranger Battalion is sanctioned, begins recruiting, and trains volunteers under command of British commando units in Dundee, Scotland. Darby and Master Sergeant Saul Rosen (Jack Warden), who also narrates the film, are called on to select a variety of men, who must undergo rigorous training by the British Commando veterans.  Darby tells his men that the British Commandos are the best soldiers in the world, but in time the Rangers will own that distinction. The American trainees are quartered in Scottish homes and several of the Rangers pair off with local lassies: Rollo Burns (Peter Brown) with Peggy McTavish (Venetia Stevenson), the daughter of the fearsome but humorous Scottish Commando instructor, Sergeant McTavish (Torin Thatcher), and vagabond Hank Bishop (Stuart Whitman), with prim and proper, Wendy Hollister (Joan Elan).

The Rangers prove their worth in Operation Torch (the invasion of French North Africa), and two more Ranger battalions are formed, with Darby promoted to colonel. Joining the Rangers is Second Lieutenant Arnold Dittmann (Edd Byrnes), a by-the-book graduate of West Point. The Rangers fight successfully in Sicily. There are several action scenes in a bombed-out Italian village where the men face a sniper, and a running firefight with the Germans. Lt. Dittmann is humanized by his encounter with Angelina De Lotta (Etchika Choureau).

Darby confides to Rosen a recurring dream of being run over by an oncoming train, foreshadowing the tragic climax. During the Battle of Anzio, the 1st and 3rd Ranger Battalions are sent on a dangerous mission; they are ambushed and wiped out by the Germans in the Battle of Cisterna. Of the 767 men who go in, only seven come back, the majority being captured. Burns is among the dead. Darby leads his 4th Ranger Battalion in an unsuccessful rescue attempt.

After the heavy losses at Cisterna, the Ranger units are disbanded. Brief vignettes show Bishop on leave with Wendy and her family, and Dittman with Angelina. At the Anzio beachhead, Rosen says goodbye to Darby, who is ordered to report to Army HQ at the Pentagon. Darby mechanically takes salutes from newly arrived troops as he walks alone down the beach to board a landing craft. Then a soldier calls out, “Look at that Ranger patch!” Darby straightens up and continues to salute, with pride, as a rousing march plays on the soundtrack. He walks alone onto the landing craft and as the boarding ramp is lifted, a printed panel acknowledges the U.S military's cooperation in the making of the film: "We dedicate this picture to the Rangers, whose rugged hard-hitting methods of training inspired techniques now employed by all fighting units of the United States Army.”

Note: In the film, nothing is mentioned of the fact that William Orlando Darby was killed in action after returning to Italy in April 1945. He was posthumously promoted to the rank of brigadier general.

Cast
 James Garner as William Orlando Darby
 Etchika Choureau as Angelina De Lotta
 Jack Warden as Saul Rosen
 Edd Byrnes as Arnold Dittmann (billed as Edward Byrnes)
 Venetia Stevenson as Peggy McTavish
 Torin Thatcher as Sergeant McTavish
 Peter Brown as Rollo Burns
 Joan Elan as Wendy Hollister
 Corey Allen as Pittsburgh Tony Sutherland
 Stuart Whitman as Hank Bishop
 Murray Hamilton as Sims Delancey
 William Wellman, Jr. as Eli Clatworthy (billed as Bill Wellman, Jr.)
 Andrea King as Sheilah Andrews
 Adam Williams as Heavy Hall
 Frieda Inescort as Lady Hollister
 Reginald Owen as Sir Arthur Hollister
 Sean Garrison as Young Soldier (film debut, uncredited)

Production
Warner Brothers had had a financial and critical hit in Battle Cry, and wanted to repeat the success with Major James Altieri's "Darby's Rangers". Altieri was known to Warner Brothers, as he had been technical advisor on Force of Arms (1951). Director William Wellman's reputation for superb war films lay in The Story of G.I. Joe and  Battleground. He was hired on condition that Warner Brothers finance his dream project, Lafayette Escadrille, about his (Wellman's) own World War I French Foreign Legion air squadron. Warner Brothers emphasised the romantic pairings of most of the leads, as a feature of the film, to emulate the success of Battle Cry; problems arose.

One problem was with the United States Army. The United States Marine Corps had enthusiastically lent bases, Marine extras, and film of its campaigns to Hollywood films to boost its public image (see The United States Marine Corps on film). But the Army was not so keen on this project. The Army felt that Ranger operations led to heavy losses of excellent soldiers that the Army thought would be better employed leading regular infantry units. By the 1950s, rather than the separate Ranger units shown in the movie, the Army preferred training individual officers and NCOs at the Ranger School, who then returned to their parent units and trained them in Ranger tactics and military values. Thus, the U.S. Army's co-operation was limited to training the actors and providing black-and-white stock footage.

Originally, Charlton Heston was cast as William O. Darby. He was enthusiastic about portraying a recent historical figure; he could interview people who knew Darby in creating his characterization. However, he asked for five percent of the profits. Jack L. Warner thought he was joking, until just before filming. (Heston later sued Warner Bros for $250,000 – $100,000 fee, $50,000 further earnings, and $100,000 damage to his career.)

Warner looked to his studio's contracted actors, and, fortuitously, replaced Heston with thirty-year-old James Garner who was already going to be in the film. Garner had the proper appearance and age to play William O. Darby, who died at age thirty-four. Garner, a Korean War veteran, was in his first leading film role. Garner's original supporting role in the film was taken by Stuart Whitman. (Garner too would later sue Warner Brothers).

Garner later wrote in his memoirs that he did not feel Wellman "wanted me in the part... and I don't blame him: I was too young for it and he deserved a bigger star. But we got along fine because we respected each other."

Originally, Tab Hunter was to play Lt. Dittmann, but quit before filming; Edd Byrnes replaced him. Garner's interpretation of Ranger commander Darby is earnest and sensitive; Byrnes' character is heartless and over-serious, the ultimate "square".  These are the opposites of the two stars' portrayals of their best-known TV characters: cynical, easy-going  Bret Maverick and hip "Kookie" of 77 Sunset Strip.

Darby's Rangers was filmed, economically, on the studio backlot. The supporting cast includes: Murray Hamilton, Adam Williams, Corey Allen, and William Wellman Jr. French actress Etchika Choureau (née Jeannine Paulette Verret) made her Hollywood début in this film, and acted in Lafayette Escadrille, then returned to Europe. Francis De Sales had an uncredited role as a captain. The film emphasizes romantic subplots, as Darby counsels his soldiers about their personal problems. William H. Clothier's black and white cinematography blends with the stock footage, and renders the sets believable.

Promotion
The premiere showing in several major US cities was preceded by a banquet where James Garner and the highest-ranking Darby Ranger in that city still in the service sat side by side at the head table.  In Philadelphia, that Darby Ranger was Captain Edward Haywood, US Army retired, 1941 to 1961, deceased 1990.

Reception
In his February 13, 1958 review in The New York Times, Bosley Crowther wryly observed that viewers “ might gather… that the major interest and pursuit of the special combat force of American soldiers that bore that tag in World War II was chasing after women. Virtually every conspicuous Ranger in this film, with the exception of the stalwart commander, runs down and catches himself a dame… the conduct of military affairs, including training and combat encounters, is given secondary emphasis in this film. The founding and the fighting of the Rangers are sketched along the way, but even those are described in such fashions as to cloak them in an aura of romance. The adventures presented in this war film constitute a recruiting officer's dream.” Crowther added that James Garner's fans “ should be completely satisfied…. William Wellman directed. He's the man who directed much better the memorable Battleground.”

Writing for the Sarasota Herald Tribune on June 11, 2011, Christopher Lloyd suggests an alternative title for the “alleged war film.. The Star-Crossed Love Lives of Darby’s Rangers. Never have I seen a military drama so done in by sex. It’s not enough to say that romance is a recurring distraction in this film; it would be more accurate to describe the battle scenes as interrupting all the mush.” He does praise two combat sequences, “notable because the movie makes extensive use of stock footage from the war, so these are some of the few combat scenes that were actually shot for the movie.”

References

External links
 
 
 
 
 James Garner interview on the Charlie Rose Show
 James Garner interview at Archive of American Television

1958 films
American black-and-white films
American World War II films
1950s English-language films
Warner Bros. films
North African campaign films
Films set in deserts
Italian Campaign of World War II films
Films directed by William A. Wellman
Films scored by Max Steiner
Films about United States Army Rangers
1950s American films